FITSNews is a United States-based news website that covers politics and current events in South Carolina.

History
FITSNews founder Will Folks worked as a campaign staffer and spokesman for Republican Gov. Mark Sanford until 2005. Folks announced he was reviving his political consulting company Viewpolitik in 2005 and founded FITSNews in 2006. Folks has been called by The State the "bad boy of South Carolina journalism" and a "Palmetto State politico with a reputation as a hell raiser" by The Guardian. The Columbia Journalism Review called FITSNews a "conservative-libertarian website covering politics," and The New York Times said it is a "jarring mix of political scoops ... and photos of scantily clad women accompanied by off-color remarks."

In 2010, as South Carolina state Rep. Nikki Haley campaigned in a Republican primary for governor, Folks published a series of blog posts claiming that Haley had engaged in an extramarital affair with him. Haley denied the allegations. Politico magazine compared the episode to the Bill Clinton sex scandal of the 1990s.

In 2017 FITSNews was sued for libel by former South Carolina legislator Kenny Bingham over a story it published which cited anonymous sources alleging ethics violations by Bingham. After Folks refused to reveal the site's sources for the story, Bingham's attorney sought to have him held in contempt of court. The South Carolina Press Association supported FITSNews' defense against the potential contempt citation, which judge William P. Keesley declined to impose. A jury ultimately ruled in favor of Bingham, and imposed nominal damages of $1 on FITSNews.

"FITS" in the site's name, FITSNews, stands for "Faith in the Sound".

Reporting
FITSNews covers news and events in South Carolina. The Columbia Journalism Review has described it as "a must-read for Palmetto State politicos". In 2010, FITSNews was named to The Washington Post's list of the "best state political blogs" in the country.

References

2006 establishments in South Carolina
Mass media in Columbia, South Carolina
American news websites